In the fall of 2015, the Washington, D.C. region's professional theaters combined to produce the Women's Voices Theater Festival. The festival consisted of over 50 companies each presenting a world premiere production of a work by one or more female playwrights. The festival claimed to be "the largest collaboration of theater companies working simultaneously to produce original works by female writers in history". The Coordinating Producers of the Women's Voices Theater Festival were Nan Barnett of the National New Play Network (NNPN) and former NNPN General Manager Jojo Ruf. The honorary committee supporting the festival was chaired by first lady Michelle Obama and included actors Allison Janney and Tea Leoni and playwrights Beth Henley, Quiara Alegría Hudes and Lynn Nottage.

Originating theatre companies
Arena Stage: Artistic Director Molly Smith
Ford's Theatre: Director Paul R. Tetreault
Round House Theatre: Producing Artistic Director Ryan Rilette
Shakespeare Theatre Company: Artistic Director Michael Kahn
Signature Theatre: Artistic Director Eric Schaeffer
Studio Theatre: Artistic Director David Muse
Woolly Mammoth Theatre Company: Artistic Director Howard Shalwitz

Plays

Post-festival
Caps For Sale The Musical, in conjunction with the 75th anniversary of the publication of the book, had a national tour ending with an Off-Broadway run at the New Victory Theater from February 27 to March 6, 2016.

References

Festivals in Washington, D.C.
Theatre festivals in the United States
2015 in theatre
2015 in Washington, D.C.
Women in theatre
Women in Washington, D.C.
Women's festivals